Copper(II) carbonate or cupric carbonate is a chemical compound with formula . At ambient temperatures, it is an ionic solid (a salt) consisting of copper(II) cations  and carbonate anions .

This compound is rarely encountered because it is difficult to prepare and readily reacts with water moisture from the air. The terms "copper carbonate", "copper(II) carbonate", and "cupric carbonate" almost always refer (even in chemistry texts) to a basic copper carbonate (or copper(II) carbonate hydroxide), such as 2 (which occurs naturally as the mineral malachite) or 2()2 (azurite).

Preparation

Thermal decomposition of the basic carbonate at atmospheric pressure yields copper(II) oxide  rather than the carbonate.

In 1960, C. W. F. T. Pistorius claimed synthesis by heating basic copper carbonate at 180 °C in an atmosphere of carbon dioxide  (450 atm) and water (50 atm) for 36 hours. The bulk of the products was well-crystallized malachite2, but a small yield of a rhombohedral substance was also obtained, claimed to be . However, this synthesis was apparently not reproduced.

Reliable synthesis of true copper(II) carbonate was reported for the first time in 1973 by Hartmut Ehrhardt and others. The compound was obtained as a gray powder, by heating basic copper carbonate in an atmosphere of carbon dioxide (produced by the decomposition of silver oxalate ) at 500 °C and 2 GPa (20,000 atm).  The compound was determined to have a monoclinic structure.

Chemical and physical properties
The stability of dry  depends critically on the partial pressure of carbon dioxide (pCO2).  It is stable for months in dry air, but decomposes slowly into  and  if pCO2 is less than 0.11 atm.

In the presence of water or moist air at 25 °C,  is stable only for pCO2 above 4.57 atmospheres and pH between about 4 and 8. Below that partial pressure, it reacts with water to form a basic carbonate (azurite,2()2).

3  +   →   + 

In highly basic solutions, the complex anion22− is formed instead.

The solubility product of the true copper(II) carbonate was measured by Reiterer and others as pKso = 11.45 ± 0.10 at 25 °C.

Structure
In the crystal structure of CuCO3, copper adopts a distorted square pyramidal coordination environment with coordination number 5. Each carbonate ion bonds to 5 copper centres.

References

Copper(II) compounds
Carbonates